Bianca de Carvalho e Silva Rinaldi (born October 15, 1974) is a Brazilian actress. She is best known for her roles in telenovelas, especially A Escrava Isaura.

Biography
Rinaldi was born in São Paulo, Brazil. She trained as a gymnast from age 8 to 13. She began her TV career in 1990 when she was chosen to be a "Paquita" for Xuxa's Show. She left the show in 1995 to pursue an acting career in Brazilian TV and theater.

At 19 she decided to study the art of interpretation, thus beginning her work in television and theater. In Malhação, still in Rede Globo, the teacher played Úrsula.

She received critical acclaim from the Brazilian media for her work on Pícara Sonhadora and A Escrava Isaura.

In 2010, Arminda was the protagonist in the novel Ribeirão do Tempo. In 2013, lived Tany character of José do Egito.

In March 2013, Rinaldi did not renew her contract with Rede Record, which integrated broadcaster since 2004.

With the non-renewal of this contract with Rede Record, the role she would play in the novel Pecado Mortal, Carlos Lombardi, was awarded to Simone Spoladore.

In the second half of 2013, the actress signed a contract with Rede Globo. She was cast in the soap opera Em Família.

Personal life
Rinaldi has been married to Eduardo Menga since January 1, 2002. They have twin daughters, Beatriz Menga and Sofia Menga (born on May 10, 2009).

Career

Television

Film

Theater

Film
 An Adventure on time (Uma aventura no tempo) (2007)
 Didi Wanna be child (Didi quer ser criança) (2004)
 Summer Dream (Sonho de Verão) (1994)
 Crystal Moon (Lua de Cristal) (1990)

References

External links 

 
 Official web site 

1974 births
Living people
Actresses from São Paulo
Brazilian telenovela actresses
Brazilian film actresses
Brazilian television actresses